Lycée Jean Vilar may refer to the following schools in France:
 Lycée Jean-Vilar (Meaux)
 Lycée Jean-Vilar (Plaisir, Yvelines)
 Lycée Jean-Vilar (Villeneuve-lès-Avignon)